KSK Energy Ventures Limited is a public limited company listed on the Bombay stock exchange in India as BOM:532997. It is a subsidiary of KSK Power Ventur Plc which listed on the Alternate Investment Market of the london stock exchange (LSE) in November 2006. KSK Power ventur Plc mainly operates in India through KSK Energy ventures Limited.

Power plants

Operational power plants
 Arasmeta, an 86 (2x43) MW coal-based power plant Arasmeta village, in Janjgir–Champa district, in Chhattisgarh
 Sai Regency, a 58 MW natural gas-based power plant at Kalugrani village, in Ramanathapuram district, in Tamil Nadu
 VS Lignite Power Plant, a 135 MW lignite-based power project at Gurha village, in Bikaner district, Rajasthan
 Sai Maithili Power, 10 MW Solar based power plant at Gurha Village, in Bikaner District, Rajasthan
 Wardha Warora Power Plant, a 540 MW (4x135 MW) coal-based power project in Chandrapur district, Maharashtra
 KSK Mahanadi Power Project Chhattisgarh, a 3,600 MW (6*600 MW) coal-based power project in Chhattisgarh. First unit of 600 MW was commissioned in May 2013, second in August 2014 and third in January 2018.

Power plants under development

 KSK Dibbin, a 130 MW, a run-of-the-river hydro-electric power project in Arunachal Pradesh

Future power plants
There are no future projects as of now.

KSK Power Ventur plc(Operation Power Plants)
 RVK Energy Private Limited, a 20 MW gas-based power plant in Andhra Pradesh
 Kasargod Power Corporation Limited (KPCL), a 200 MW LSHS-based power plant in Kerala

References

External links
 KSK Energy Ventures Limited Overview
 KSK Energy Ventures Limited(Public, BOM:532997) Stock
 KSK Energy Ventures Ltd (Bombay Stock Exchange) Reuters

Electric power companies of India
Companies based in Hyderabad, India
Energy in Andhra Pradesh
Year of establishment missing
Indian companies established in 2001
2001 establishments in Andhra Pradesh
Energy companies established in 2001
Companies listed on the National Stock Exchange of India
Companies listed on the Bombay Stock Exchange